Pseytuk is a rural locality (an aul) in Afipsipskoye Rural Settlement of Takhtamukaysky District, the Republic of Adygea, Russia. The population was 630 as of 2018. There are 31 streets.

Geography 
The aul is located on the left bank of the Kuban River, 46 km northwest of Takhtamukay (the district's administrative centre) by road. Stefanovsky is the nearest rural locality.

Ethnicity 
The aul is inhabited by Adyghes.

Notable people
Murat Akhedzhak (1962–2010), politician, Deputy Head of Administration of Krasnodar Krai

References 

Rural localities in Takhtamukaysky District